Aldo Palazzari (July 25, 1918 – May 12, 2007) was an American professional ice hockey player who played 35 games in the National Hockey League with the Boston Bruins and New York Rangers during the 1943–44. An eye injury during the Rangers' 1944 training camp forced him to retire from playing. He was the father of former NHL player Doug Palazzari.

Career statistics

Regular season and playoffs

External links
 

1910s births
2007 deaths
American men's ice hockey right wingers
American people of Italian descent
Boston Bruins players
Boston Olympics players
Ice hockey players from Minnesota
Illinois Fighting Illini men's ice hockey players
New York Rangers players
Sportspeople from Eveleth, Minnesota